John Dillon (1851–1927) was an Irish nationalist politician.

John Dillon may also refer to:

John Dillon (baseball), 19th-century baseball player
John Dillon (comedian) (1831–1913), American comedian based in Chicago
John Dillon, one-half of the Dillon Brothers vaudeville group in late 1800s
John Dillon, original member of southern rock band the Ozark Mountain Daredevils
John A. Dillon (1923–2005), American physicist, administrator and professor at the University of Louisville

John Forrest Dillon (1831–1914), American jurist from Iowa
Hook Dillon (John Dillon, 1924–2004), American basketball player for the University of North Carolina
John J. Dillon (publisher) (1856–1950), editor and publisher; commissioner of the New York State Department of Foods and Markets
John J. Dillon (baseball) American baseball player
John J. Dillon (politician) (1926–1983), American politician from Indiana
John M. Dillon (born 1939), Irish philosopher and neo-Platonic scholar
John T. Dillon (actor) (1876–1937), American film actor
John T. Dillon (businessman) (born 1938), American business executive
John Webb Dillon (1877–1949), British film actor
John Blake Dillon (1814–1866), Irish writer and politician
John Robert Dillon (died 1948), architect active in Atlanta, Georgia
Sir John Talbot Dillon (1739–1805), Irish politician and baronet, traveller and historical writer
John Talbot Dillon (author) (1734–1806), Anglo-Irish naval officer, traveller and historian
John Dillon (Australian politician) (1847–1888), New South Wales politician and barrister
John Dillon (hurler) (1943–2019), Irish hurler
John Dillon (sailor) (1921–1988), British sailor
John Dillon (footballer, born 1978), Scottish footballer 
John Dillon (footballer, born 1942), Scottish footballer for Sunderland
Jack Dillon (1891–1942), boxer